The Xhosa are a nation from southern Africa. Xhosa, the one after whom the Xhosa people are named, fathered Malangana. The Xhosa kingship separated when the line got to Phalo because of what happened when he married.

Xhosa family tree

 Ntu,
 Mnguni kaNtu,
 Xhosa kaMnguni ( Nguni nation would come to be known as AmaXhosa )
 Malangana KaXhosa,
 Ngcwangube KaMalangana,
 Nkosiyane KaNgcwangube,
 Nkosiyamntu KaNkosiyane,
 Tshawe KaNkosiyamntu (Xhosa royal clan is named after him),
 Ngcwangu KaTshawe,
 Sikhomo KaNgcwangu,
 Togu KaSikhomo,
 Ngconde KaTogu,
 Tshiwo KaNgconde,
 Phalo KaTshiwo,
 Gcaleka KaPhalo & Rharhabe KaPhalo.

It was during Phalo's rule that the Xhosa nation officially established a Right-Hand House. When Phalo had to marry a wife that would produce an heir to the throne, two royal brides (One from Mpondo royal family & the other from Thembu royal family) arrived on the same day. This caused a dilemma for the Xhosa King as it meant that if he chose either of them, the father of the unpicked bride would be offended.

Xhosa elders and all the known wise men who knew the Xhosa laws & customs across Xhosa land were summoned to Komkhulu (The great place - in the present day town of Butterworth) to solve this problem. It has been said in the Xhosa oral history that, it was one old man by the name of Majeke who came with a solution to that problem. His solution was: "What is greater than the head of the king, and what is stronger than his right hand? Let the one be the head wife and the other the wife of the right hand". And that way, the problem was solved.

Phalo produced two known sons: Gcaleka and Rharhabe. Gcaleka would later become the King of the Xhosa Kingdom and Rharhabe became the ruler of the Rharhabe House(Right hand House). Prior the arrival of the Europeans, the Xhosa territory stretched from Mbhashe River to Gamtoos River in the Southern Cape. The Gcaleka House had jurisdiction from Mbhashe river to Kei river, and the Rharhabe House beyond the Kei River and extended beyond the Fish River.

Gcaleka Kings: Great House

 Gcaleka KaPhalo, 
 Khawuta KaGcaleka,
 Hintsa KaKhawuta (The most renowned & respected King in Xhosa history - Aa! Zanzolo!),
 Sarhili KaHintsa,
 Sigcawu KaSarhili,
 Gwebinkumbi KaSigcawu,
 Ngangomhlaba KaGwebinkumbi,
 Zwelidumile KaGwebinkumbi,
 Xolilizwe KaGwebinkumbi,
 Zwelonke KaXolilizwe, 
 Ahlangene KaXolilizwe Aa! Vulikhaya (The current king).

Rharhabe Kings: Right Hand House

 Rharhabe KaPhalo,
 Mlawu KaRharhabe,
 Ndlambe kaRharhabe, 
 Ngqika KaMlawu, 
 Maqoma  KaNgqika(Also commander of the Xhosa Army, - Aa! Jongumsobomvu!),
 Sandile KaNgqika,
 Gonya KaSandile,
 Faku KaGonya (Not to be confused with the Amampondo King),
 Velile KaFaku,
 Mxolisi KaVelile,
 Maxhob’ayakhawuleza KaMxolisi,
Jonguxolo KaMaxhob'ayakhawuleza (Aa!Vululwandle!) (The current king)'' .

Xhosa Kingship Line

Xhosa culture